William Amos may refer to:

William Bradshaw Amos (born 1945), British biologist
Bill Amos (1898–1987), college football player and coach
William Amos (agriculturist) (1745–1825)
William Amos (cricketer) (1860–1935), Australian cricketer
Will Amos (born 1974), Canadian Liberal politician